Neuhof may refer to:

Places

In Austria 
 Neuhof, Austria, a part of Untersiebenbrunn

In the Czech Republic 
 Neuhof, the old German name of Nový Dvůr, near Nymburk

In France 
 Neuhof, Strasbourg, a district in the south of Strasbourg

In Germany 
 , a district in the port area of Hamburg, Germany
 Neuhof, Hesse, a municipality near Fulda, Hesse
 Neuhof, Lower Saxony, in the Hildesheim district, Lower Saxony
 Neuhof an der Zenn, in the Neustadt (Aisch)-Bad Windsheim district, Bavaria
 Penkun-Neuhof, a part of Penkun in the Uecker-Randow district, Mecklenburg-Vorpommern
 Neuhöfer Karpfenteiche, ponds in the west of Mecklenburg-Vorpommern
 Neuhofer See, a lake in Landkreis Nordwestmecklenburg, Mecklenburg-Vorpommern
 Neuhof Substation, was a 110 kV electrical substation in Neuhof, Bad Sachsa, Lower Saxony
 Bahnhof Neuhof bei Zossen station, a railway station in the village of Neuhof, Brandenburg

In Poland 
 Neuhof, the German name for Nowy Dwór, Gmina Koronowo, Bydgoszcz County, Kuyavian-Pomeranian Voivodeship, in north-central Poland

In Romania 
 Neuhof, the German name for Bogda Commune, Timiș County

In United States 
 Neuhof Hutterite Colony in Mountain Lake Township, Cottonwood County, Minnesota

See also 
 Neuhofen
 Neuenhof (disambiguation)